Arab Health is a healthcare conference and trade show in the Middle East. It first took place in Dubai, United Arab Emirates in 1975. Healthcare industry representatives attend from the Middle East, Asia, Europe and the United States.

Exhibition and congress 
The congress is one of the world's largest medical conferences.

Arab Health is supported by the UAE Ministry of Health, the Abu Dhabi Health Authority, the Dubai Health Authority and the Dubai Healthcare City Authority.

Awards 
Awards are given for innovation and achievement in the industry. They include awards for radiology, surgery, laboratory work, patient-centred care, and clinicians.

History

See also 
 Health in the United Arab Emirates

References 

Events in Dubai
Medical conferences
Medical education
Healthcare in the United Arab Emirates
Trade fairs in the United Arab Emirates
Recurring events established in 1975
1975 establishments in the United Arab Emirates